Saket Express (11067/11068) is a train that runs twice per week between Faizabad junction (officially Ayodhya Cantt) and Lokmanya Tilak Terminus Mumbai. The train was introduced in 1988 and the inaugural run took place on 7 May 1988.

History 
In the beginning the train used to run between Bombay Victoria Terminus (station code VT) [now Chhatrapati Shivaji Maharaj Terminus Mumbai, (station code CSMT)] and Faizabad (station code FD) but later on the starting station was shifted from Mumbai CSMT to Lokmanya Tilak Terminus Kurla (station code LTT) from where it currently runs.

Saket Express is one of the two trains that connect Faizabad to Mumbai via Sultanpur Junction and Pratapgarh Junction, the other being the Faizabad Superfast Express, which runs once a week via Shahganj Junction and Jaunpur Junction.

See also
 Faizabad Delhi Express
 Faizabad Superfast Express
 Faizabad Railway Station
 Ayodhya Railway Station

References

External links
 11067 Saket Express at India Rail Info

Named passenger trains of India
Rail transport in Maharashtra
Rail transport in Madhya Pradesh
Transport in Mumbai
Trains from Faizabad
Express trains in India